Carolyn Pease-Lopez is a Democratic former member of the Montana House of Representatives, serving from 2009 until 2017. She was elected to House District 42 which represents the Big Horn County area. Pease-Lopez is a member of the Crow Tribe, and has stated her intention in protecting tribal land, with a focus on giving federal protections to the Pryor Mountains.

Pease-Lopez served as Minority Caucus Leader of the House during the 2015-2016 session.

References

Living people
Crow people
Democratic Party members of the Montana House of Representatives
Native American state legislators in Montana
Native American women in politics
Politicians from Billings, Montana
Place of birth missing (living people)
Women state legislators in Montana
Year of birth missing (living people)
21st-century American women
21st-century Native American women
21st-century Native Americans